Peter Knobel (January 13, 1943 – August 20, 2019) was an American Reform rabbi, educator and editor. He was the rabbi of Beth Emet The Free Synagogue in Evanston, Illinois for three decades.

Biography
Knobel was ordained at the Hebrew Union College-Jewish Institute of Religion, and he earned a PhD from Yale University.He graduated from Hamilton College in Clinton, NY. He was the rabbi of Temple Emanu-El in Groton, Connecticut from 1969 to 1980, followed by Beth Emet The Free Synagogue in Evanston, Illinois from 1980 to 2010. After he became rabbi emeritus at Beth Emet, he was the interim senior rabbi at Temple Sholom in Chicago, Temple Judea in Coral Gables, Florida, and finally at the Temple Israel of Hollywood in Los Angeles in July–August 2019.

Knobel taught at the University of New Haven, the University of Connecticut, and the Spertus Institute for Jewish Learning and Leadership. He edited several books, including one about Rabbi Walter Jacob, and he wrote many articles. He was the past president of the Central Conference of American Rabbis, the Chicago Board of Rabbis, and the Chicago Association of Reform Rabbis. He served on the boards of the American Jewish Committee, Association of Reform Zionists of America, the Union for Reform Judaism, Jewish United Fund of Metropolitan Chicago, and on the council of the Parliament of the World's Religions.

With his wife Elaine, Knobel had two sons and six grandchildren. He died of a heart attack on August 20, 2019 in Los Angeles, and he was buried at the Memorial Park Cemetery in Skokie, Illinois on August 26, 2019.

Works

References

1943 births
2019 deaths
Clergy from Newark, New Jersey
Writers from Newark, New Jersey
Hebrew Union College – Jewish Institute of Religion alumni
Yale University alumni
American book editors
American Reform rabbis
Rabbis from Illinois
Rabbis from New Jersey
20th-century American rabbis
21st-century American rabbis